This is a list of weapons used in the American Indian Wars.

Offensive weapons

Edged weapons

 Claymore
 Cutlass
 Dirk
 Flail
 Gunstock war club
 Improvised knife
 Inuit axe
 Jawbone war club
 Khanjali
 Lance
 Lochaber axe
 Morning star
 Pernach
 Shashka
 Snow knife
 Spear
 Stone war club
 Toggling harpoon
 Tomahawk
 Ulu
 War hatchet
 Wooden war club (sharp headed version and curve headed version)

Sidearms

 Colt M1873 Single Action Army

Shotguns

 Coach gun

Rifles and muskets

 Charleville M1728 and M1763 musket
 Colt M1855 revolver carbine and rifle
 Henry M1860 repeating rifle
 Meylin M1719 Pennsylvania-Kentucky rifled musket
 Pattern P1722 Brown Bess musket
 Peabody M1862 Action rifle
 Sharps M1848, M1863 carbine and rifle
 Spencer M1860 repeating carbine and rifle
 Springfield M1873 Trapdoor rifle

Projectile weapons

 Bow
 Crossbow
 Throwing dart
 Throwing knife
 Throwing spear
 Throwing tomahawk

Explosives and grenades

 Adams grenade
 Dynamite 
 Ketchum grenade
 Rains grenade
 Rains landmine

Machine guns

 Gatling machine gun

Artillery

 Hotchkiss cannon
 Parrott 10-pounder M1861 cannon

Defensive weapons

Shields and body armor

 War shield

References

Bibliography

 

Weapons
Weapons
Weapons by war
Lists of weapons